World Snooker Championship 2005 is a sports video game developed by Blade Interactive and published by Sega for Microsoft Windows, PlayStation 2, Xbox and PlayStation Portable.

Overview

This is the first game in the series to use the official World Snooker Championship moniker for the game. The game features modes similar to the previous entry in the series, with a career mode, tournament mode, and online modes, as well as quickplay and training modes. The game also features an unlockable "League of Champions" which allows you to replay past real-life events. The game features additional modes to previous releases, with options to play games such as bar billiards.

Paul Hunter was planned to feature on the game's cover, but would be diagnosed with cancer before the game's release. He would continue to play the sport until 2006, when he died from neuroendocrine tumours in the lining of his stomach. With later releases of the game by Sold-out Software, his image and likeness remained on the cover and in the game but with a tribute on the back of the box "Paul Hunter 1978 - 2006".

After meeting certain requirements, videos of real-life shots are played, showing professional players performing the same shots.

Reception

World Snooker Championship 2005 received "mixed or average" and "generally positive" reviews, according to review aggregator GameRankings.

Eurogamer scored the console version highly with a 8/10 score, saying "it's a snooker game that gets pretty much everything spot on", but would later rate the PSP version lower at 6/10.

References

External links

2005 video games
Europe-exclusive video games
PlayStation 2 games
PlayStation Portable games
Pool video games
2005
Video games developed in the United Kingdom
Windows games
Xbox games
Sega video games